Matthew Denny (born 2 June 1996) is an Australian athlete specialising in the discus throw. He qualified for the Tokyo 2020 Olympics and competed in the final having thrown 65.13 m in his Men's discus throw qualification. He came very close to a medal, throwing 67.02 m which was just 0.05 m less than the bronze medalist, Lukas Weißhaidinger  of Austria.

Early years 
Denny grew up in the small town of Allora (population 1000), located 60 km outside Toowoomba and 150 km south-west of Brisbane. He  had plenty of space to throw things. For example, in Grade 1 at primary school he threw bean bags as shot puts and vortexes as javelins. His main focus, though, until grade 8 or 9, was rugby league. Denny was one of eight siblings and just wanted to be as good as his rugby-playing brothers.

In his teens Denny turned his attention to athletics and built a homemade discus circle on his family's rural property. In 2013, he won the World Under 18 Youth Championships discus title and then came fourth at the 2014 Under 20 World Junior Championships. He then won a silver medal at the 2015 Summer Universiade.

Achievements 
In April 2016, Denny won the national discus title with a throw of 60.47m and the hammer title with 68.44m. He became just the second athlete in the near 100-year history of the event to win this double and the first since Keith Pardon in 1953 – 63 years earlier.  

Denny represented his country in the discus at the 2016 Summer Olympics in Rio de Janeiro without qualifying for the final. Denny then competed at the Commonwealth Games trials in February 2018. With just 14 hours separating the hammer and discus events, he required just one valid hammer throw to claim the title and automatic Commonwealth Games selection. Denny also won the discus. With selection in both events, he became the second Australian athlete, and first in 68 years, to compete in both events at the Commonwealth Games, following Keith Pardon who competed in the same pair at the 1938 and 1950 Empire Games.

In February 2020 in Wellington New Zealand, Denny threw a personal best of 65.47m. In March 2021 he won the national title with 63.88m, but still remained short of the Olympic standard. In June 2021 on the Gold Coast, Queensland he qualified with a 68cm personal best of 66.15m which moved him from fifth to third Australian all-time.

His personal best in discus is 67.02m set in Tokyo in 2021. His personal best in the hammer throw is 74.88m set in Gold Coast in 2018.

International competitions

References

External links
 
 
 
 

1996 births
Living people
Australian male discus throwers
Australian male hammer throwers
Athletes (track and field) at the 2016 Summer Olympics
Athletes (track and field) at the 2018 Commonwealth Games
Sportspeople from Toowoomba
Olympic athletes of Australia
Universiade medalists in athletics (track and field)
Commonwealth Games medallists in athletics
Commonwealth Games silver medallists for Australia
Universiade silver medalists for Australia
Australian Athletics Championships winners
Universiade gold medalists in athletics (track and field)
Medalists at the 2015 Summer Universiade
Medalists at the 2019 Summer Universiade
Athletes (track and field) at the 2020 Summer Olympics
21st-century Australian people
Medallists at the 2018 Commonwealth Games